"Carousel" is a song by American recording artist Melanie Martinez. The song was featured on Martinez's debut EP, Dollhouse (2014) and her debut studio album, As The second single on Cry Baby (2015). "Carousel" was released on September 1, 2014, as the second single from Dollhouse. A music video accompanying the song was released on October 15, 2014. The song was used in the trailer for the fourth season of the horror anthology television series American Horror Story.

Background and composition
In 2014, the song was featured in a preview of season four of FX's horror anthology series, American Horror Story, with the theme also being a riff on the song. Martinez told the Huffington Post that American Horror Story is "'absolutely, hands down' her favorite show" and mentioned that she contacted FX about the song as soon as she heard about the season's carnival theme. She later received a call from the network two days before the promo aired.

"Carousel" is labeled as indie pop, described by Martinez as, "My feeling in love with someone and being stuck on the same ride and trying to grab them but I never reach them".

Critical reception
Lyndsey Parker of Yahoo! Music praised the song and Martinez, saying, "Melanie Martinez has moved on from The Voice to American Horror Story. And her new song and video are so good. The two-toned-haired Goth girl wonder, one of the most unique contestants to ever appear on The Voice ... While her new video for the song, out just in time for Halloween, isn't quite as twisted as anything on AHS, it's still totally creepy-cool, depicting a doomed romance that literally spins out of control at a dark, deserted Long Island carnival".

Track listing

Charts and certifications

Charts

Certifications

Release history

Notes

References

External links

2014 singles
2014 songs
Atlantic Records singles
Melanie Martinez songs
Songs written by Kinetics (rapper)
Songs written by Melanie Martinez
Songs written by One Love (record producer)
Television drama theme songs
Torch songs
Songs about heartache